Mohammad Waheed (born 13 August 1993) is a Pakistani first-class cricketer who plays for Lahore.

References

External links
 

1993 births
Living people
Pakistani cricketers
Lahore cricketers
Cricketers from Lahore